National Highway 719 (NH 719) is a  National Highway in India. It connects Etawah in Uttar Pradesh and Gwalior in Madhya Pradesh it was formerly known as National Highway 92.

Route
NH19 near Etawah
Bhind
NH44 near Gwalior in Madhya Pradesh

References

National highways in India
Transport in Gwalior
National Highways in Uttar Pradesh
National Highways in Madhya Pradesh